Čireliai (formerly ) is a village in Kėdainiai district municipality, in Kaunas County, in central Lithuania. According to the 2011 census, the village had a population of 9 people. It is located 4 km from Kėdainiai, 1 km from Sirutiškis by the Kruostas, Baltupis and Vensutis rivers.

History
At the beginning of the 20th century, Čireliai was an estate of Sipowicze family.

Demography

References

Villages in Kaunas County
Kėdainiai District Municipality